The Journal of Applied Electrochemistry is a peer-reviewed scientific journal published by Springer Science+Business Media covering electrochemistry, focusing on technologically oriented aspects. A major topic of the journal is the application of electrochemistry to technological development and practice. 
Subjects covered are cell design, electrochemical reaction engineering, corrosion, hydrometallurgy, the electrochemical treatment of effluents, molten salt and solid state electrochemistry, solar cells, new battery systems, and surface finishing.

Impact factor 
The Journal of Applied Electrochemistry has a 2021 impact factor of 2.925.

Editor 
The editor of the journal is Gerardine G. Botte.

References

External links 

Springer Science+Business Media academic journals
Publications established in 1971
Monthly journals
Electrochemistry journals